Ready for the Night is the debut studio album by Belgian DJ and producer Laurent Wéry. It was released in Belgium on July 19, 2010. The album has peaked to number 95 in Belgium. The album includes the singles "My Sound", "Looking At Me (J'aime regarder)", "On the Dancefloor", "Nagasaki", "Get Down" and "Ready for the Night".

Singles
 "My Sound" was released as the lead single from the album on February 14, 2009.
 "Looking At Me (J'aime regarder)" was released as the second single from the album on July 8, 2009.
 "On the Dancefloor" was released as the third single from the album on September 11, 2009.
 "Nagasaki" was released as the fourth single from the album on November 16, 2009.
 "Get Down" was released as the fifth single from the album on March 1, 2010.
 "Ready for the Night" was released as the sixth single from the album on July 22, 2010.

Track listing

Chart performance

Weekly charts

Release history

References

2010 debut albums
Laurent Wéry albums